Robert Philippe Gustave de Rothschild (19 January 1880 – 25 December 1946) was a French banker, philanthropist and polo player.

Early life
Robert de Rothschild was born on 19 January 1880 in Paris, France. His father, Baron Gustave de Rothschild, was a banker. His mother was Cécile Anspach.

Career

He was a banker.

During World War II, he was on the Nazi blacklist. Moreover, his French citizenship was nullified by the Vichy government because he was Jewish. He escaped to England and emigrated to the United States, arriving in New York City in August 1940. He stayed there for five years, throughout the war years.

Philanthropy
He supported Jewish causes in France, and later New York City. After the war, he supported efforts to revive Jewish life in France.

Polo
He was a four-goal polo player. He was the founder of the Deauville International Polo Club in 1907. He organized the Laversine Open Polo Cup on the grounds of his chateau in Saint-Maximin. He also organized tournaments in Apremont in 1920. By 1995, Apremont was home to the Polo Club du Domaine de Chantilly.

He won the International Paris Tournament in 1907 and the Paris Open in 1920.

Personal life
He married Gabrielle Nelly Régine Beer on 6 March 1907. They resided at the Château de Laversine. They had two sons and two daughters:
 Diane Cécile Alice Juliette de Rothschild (1907–1996), married to Anatol Mühlstein ( 1932), and Joseph Benvenuti ( 1952)
 James Gustave Jules Alain de Rothschild (1910–1982), married Mary Chauvin du Treuil ( 1938)
 Cécile Léonie Eugénie Gudule Lucie de Rothschild (1913–1995)
 Élie Robert de Rothschild (1917–2007), married to Liliane Fould-Springer ( 1942)
During the war, his two sons were captured by the Nazis.

Death
He died of pneumonia on Christmas Day, 25 December 1946 in Lausanne, Switzerland at age 66.

References

1880 births
1946 deaths
Sportspeople from Oise
French bankers
French philanthropists
French polo players
French exiles
19th-century French Jews
Businesspeople from Paris
Robert
Deaths from pneumonia in Switzerland